The Ministry of Finance is a government ministry of Algeria responsible for public finances. Its head office is the Immeuble Ahmed Francis in Ben Aknoun, Algiers. As of 2022, Brahim Djamel Kassali is the current Minister of Finance.

Ministers of Finance
Ahmed Francis, 1962 - 1963
Bachir Boumaza, September 1963 - July 1965
Kaïd Ahmed, July 1965 - March 1968
Cherif Belkacem, March 1968 - April 1969
Ahmed Medaghri, April 1969 - July 1970
Smain Mahrouk, July 1970 - February 1976
Abdelmalek Temmam, February 1976 - April 1977
Mohamed Seddik Benyahia, April 1977 - March 1979
M’hamed Yala, March 1979 - January 1982
Boualem Ben Hamouda, January 1982 - February 1986
Abdelaziz Khellef, February 1986 - November 1988
Sid Ahmed Ghozali, November 1988 - September 1989
Ghazi Hidouci, September 1989 - June 1991
Hocine Benissad, June 1991 - October 1991
Sid Ahmed Ghozali, October 1991 - June 1992
Belaid Abdessalam, July 1992 - August 1993
Mourad Benachenhou, August 1993 - April 1994
Ahmed Benbitour, April 1994 - September 1996
Abdelkrim Harchaoui, September 1996 - December 1999
Abdelatif Benachenhou, December 1999 - May 2001
Mourad Medelci, May 2001 - June 2002
Mohamed Terbéche, June 2002 - May 2003
Abdelatif Benachenhou, May 2003 - May 2005
Mourad Medelci, May 2005 - June 2007
Karim Djoudi, June 2007 - May 2014
Mohamed Djellab, May 2014 – May 2015
Abderrahmane Benkhalfa, May 2015 - June 2016
Hadji Baba Ammi, June 2016 - May 2017
Abderrahmane Raouya, May 2017 - March 2019
Mohamed Loukal, March 2019 - January 2020
Abderrahmane Raouya, January 2020 - June 2020	
Aïmene Benabderrahmane, June 2020 - February 2022
Abderrahmane Raouya, February 2022 - June 2022
Brahim Djamel Kassali, June 2022 -

References

External links

 Ministry of Finance 

Finance
Algeria
1962 establishments in Algeria